Asota fereunicolor is a moth of the family Erebidae first described by Hervé de Toulgoët in 1972. It is found on the Comores in the Indian Ocean.

External links
 Species info

Asota (moth)
Moths of the Comoros
Moths described in 1972